Stanisław Łojasiewicz (9 October 1926 – 14 November 2002) was a Polish mathematician.

Biography
At the end of the 1950s, he solved the problem of distribution division by analytic functions, introducing the %C5%81ojasiewicz inequality. Its solution opened the road to important results in the new theory of partial differential equations. The method established by 
Łojasiewicz led him to advance the theory of semianalytic sets, which opened an important chapter in modern analysis.

Commemoration
The Łojasiewicz Lectures are a series of annual lectures in mathematics given at the Jagiellonian University in honour of Łojasiewicz.

See also
 Real algebraic geometry

References

1926 births
2002 deaths
20th-century Polish mathematicians
21st-century Polish mathematicians
Recipients of the State Award Badge (Poland)